Kębło  is a village in the administrative district of Gmina Wąwolnica, within Puławy County, Lublin Voivodeship, in eastern Poland.

See also
 Virgin Kębelska

References

Villages in Puławy County